An Oklahoma Cowboy is a 1929 American silent Western film directed by J.P. McGowan and starring Art Acord and Dorothy Vernon.

Cast
 Art Acord 
 Ione Reed  
 J.P. McGowan  
 Dorothy Vernon
 Slim Whitaker
 Bobby Dunn
 Cliff Lyons

References

Bibliography
 Robert B. Connelly. The Silents: Silent Feature Films, 1910-36, Volume 40, Issue 2. December Press, 1998.

External links
 

1929 films
1929 Western (genre) films
American black-and-white films
Films directed by J. P. McGowan
Silent American Western (genre) films
1920s English-language films
1920s American films